Predicrostonyx hopkinsi is an extinct rodent in the family Cricetidae, and is considered one of the earliest examples of collared lemmings.

References

Musser, G. G. and M. D. Carleton. 2005. Superfamily Muroidea. pp. 894–1531 in Mammal Species of the World a Taxonomic and Geographic Reference. D. E. Wilson and D. M. Reeder eds. Johns Hopkins University Press, Baltimore.

Dicrostonychini
Prehistoric rodent genera
Extinct rodents
Pleistocene genus extinctions
Fossil taxa described in 1971